Much Hoole is a civil parish in the South Ribble district of Lancashire, England.  It contains eight buildings that are recorded in the National Heritage List for England as designated listed buildings.  Of these, one is listed at Grade II*, the middle grade, and the others are at Grade II, the lowest grade.  The parish contains the village of Much Hoole, and is otherwise rural.  Most of the listed buildings are houses or farmhouses, the others being a church and a milestone.


Key

Buildings

References

Citations

Sources

Lists of listed buildings in Lancashire
Buildings and structures in South Ribble